Area 22 can refer to:

 Area 22 (Nevada National Security Site)
 Brodmann area 22